Dr.Adnan Bin Abdullah Al Mazrooa (born 6 March 1954) Director of Taibah University since March 20, 2012 till now.

Practical experience 
 Agent King Abdulaziz University
 Consultant anesthesia, at King Abdulaziz University.
 Associate Professor, King Abdul Aziz University, School of Medicine.
 Dean of the Faculty of Medicine at King Abdul Aziz University.
 Agent Faculty of Medicine and the King Abdul Aziz University Hospital Director.
 Head of the Department of Anesthesia and Intensive Care.

Training courses 
 Workshop in strategic leadership of the International Organization Leadership.
 Workshop on Effective Personal Productivity.
 Workshop in the assessment of the administrative efficiency.
 Workshop on modern methods of medical education in Singapore.
 Workshop on strategic challenges in the planning and implementation.
 Workshop in management skills academic leaders.
 Workshop in the design and development of hospitals.
 Workshop in health care management service.
 A training session of the American College of Physicians Executives.
 Summer Institute of the American College of Physicians Executives.

References 

1954 births
Living people